Javorje is a dispersed settlement in the hills southeast of Črna na Koroškem in the Carinthia region in northern Slovenia.

The parish church in the settlement is dedicated to Mary Magdalene and belongs to the Roman Catholic Archdiocese of Maribor. It was first mentioned in written documents dating to the 14th century, but has been rebuilt at various stages, receiving its current Baroque appearance in the 18th century. There is a second church in the eastern part of the settlement belonging to the same parish. It is dedicated to Saint Jodocus and dates to the 17th century. It is a single-nave church with a rib-vaulted sanctuary and a spire.

References

External links
Javorje on Geopedia

Populated places in the Municipality of Črna na Koroškem